Sir (Charles Edward) Archibald Watkin Hamilton (assumed name of Abdullah in 1923),The Islamic Review, vol. 12, Khwajah Kamal al-Din, 1924, p. 41 5th and 3rd Baronet (10 December 1876 – 18 March 1939) was a British convert to Islam.

He was the son of Sir Edward Archibald Hamilton, 4th Baronet of Trebishun, Breconshire and 2nd Baronet of Marlborough House, Hampshire (1843–1915) and his wife Mary Elizabeth Gill. He inherited both baronetcies upon the death of his father in 1915. He was also a descendant of William Hamilton, one of the five Kentish Petitioners of 1701, great-grandson of Admiral Sir Edward Joseph Hamilton, 1st Baronet Hamilton of Marlborough House, direct descendant of the Duke of Abercorn and also Lord Hamilton who married Princess Mary Stewart of Scotland, daughter of James II of Scotland. He served as a Lieutenant in the Royal Defence Corps and was at one time President of the Selsey (Sussex) Conservative Association, and also later a member of Sir Oswald Mosley's British Union of Fascists for a brief period during the 1930s.

Marriages and children

He was married three times and twice divorced.

Olga FitzGeorge 
Sir Archibald married Olga Mary Adelaide FitzGeorge, daughter of Rear-Admiral Sir Adolphus FitzGeorge KCVO and Sophia Jane Holden, granddaughter of the Duke of Cambridge and first cousin to Queen Victoria on 18 December 1897 in London. The marriage resulted in two children, George Edward Archibald Augustus FitzGeorge Hamilton (30 December 1898 – 18 May 1918) whose baptism was attended by Queen Mary and King George V who along with the Duke of Cambridge were pledged to be his godparents. He was killed in action in May 1918. They had one unnamed daughter (b. 5 May 1902 – d. 5 May 1902). They divorced in 1902.

Algorta Child
In November 1906, he married secondly Algorta Marjory Blanche Child, the daughter of George Child, of Widford, Hertfordshire, but she divorced him in 1915.

Lilian Austen
In 1927, Sir Archibald married Lilian Maud (b. 1880 – d. 1964), daughter of William Austen, of Sydenham, Kent. Lady Hamilton also converted to Islam, taking the name Miriam.

Conversion to Islam
Sir Archibald converted to Islam on 20 December 1923. He noted that "...the beauty and the simple purity of Islam have always appealed to me. I could never, though born and brought up as a Christian, believe in the dogmatic aspect of the Church... I found that both the Church of Rome and the Church of England were of no real use to me" and that having converted to Islam he felt "a better and truer man".

Death

He died on 18 March 1939 at the age of 62, and is buried at the Brookwood Cemetery alongside Rowland Allanson-Winn, 5th Baron Headley, they having been "great friends in life" and "close comrades-in-arms in the cause of Islam".

See also 
Henry Stanley, 3rd Baron Stanley of Alderley
Marmaduke Pickthall
William Abdullah Quilliam
Faris Glubb
Timothy Winter

References

External links
 Sir Abdullah Archibald Hamilton's obituary as published in the Islamic Review June 1939
 Photographic Archive from The Woking Muslim Mission, England, 1913–1968

1876 births
1939 deaths
Royal Defence Corps officers
Baronets in the Baronetage of Great Britain
Baronets in the Baronetage of the United Kingdom
Royal Sussex Regiment officers
Burials at Brookwood Cemetery
Converts to Islam from Christianity
English former Christians
English Muslims
Archibald
Archibald